William Gaston Lewis (September 3, 1835 – January 7, 1901) was a Confederate general in the American Civil War.

Early life
William G. Lewis was born September 3, 1835, in Rocky Mount, North Carolina. He was the son of Dr. John Wesley Lewis and Catherine Ann Battle.  His first cousin Anna Lewis married Captain Luther Rice Mills, who later became a college Professor at Wake Forest University. He was educated at Lovejoy's Academy in Raleigh. Soon after the death of his father, the family moved to Chapel Hill, where Lewis entered the University of North Carolina, studying civil engineering. Lewis graduated in 1855.

He then taught in Chapel Hill for a year, before moving to Florida. In 1857, he was appointed to the U. S. Survey Corps, and worked in Minnesota for over a year. He then returned to North Carolina and became assistant engineer on the Wilmington and Weldon Railroad.

American Civil War
When the Civil War began, Lewis joined the Confederate army as the third lieutenant of Company A, 1st North Carolina Regiment ("Bethel"). His first fighting came in the Battle of Big Bethel on June 10, 1861. By January 1862, he had been promoted to major and took part in the Battle of New Bern. For his actions at New Bern, he was promoted to lieutenant colonel of the 33rd North Carolina Infantry. Lewis fought with the regiment at the Seven Days Battle and the Battle of Malvern Hill. During the later months of 1862, he took part in the defense of Richmond.

Lewis returned to North Carolina in December 1862 and took part in the fighting in and around New Bern and Kinston. In the spring of 1863, his regiment returned to Virginia and he took part in the Gettysburg Campaign with the 43rd North Carolina Infantry as part of Brigadier General Junius Daniel's Brigade of Major General Robert Rodes' Division. At Gettysburg, the regimental commander, Colonel Thomas S. Kenan, was wounded and captured, and Lewis took command of the regiment.

After the Confederate retreat from Gettysburg, Lewis returned to North Carolina and took positions around New Bern. He subsequently took part in the fighting to recapture Plymouth. He led Robert Hoke's brigade at the Battle of Cold Harbor and was promoted to brigadier general following the battle in June 1864. He was then wounded during Jubal Early's raid on Washington. In 1864, he married Martha Lucinda "Mittie" Pender, first cousin of Major General Dorsey Pender. Lewis also supervised the entrenchment of Drewry's Bluff, Virginia. He took part in a skirmish near Farmville, Virginia, on April 7, 1865, but was once again wounded and captured during the fighting. He was paroled within two weeks. Throughout his military service in the Confederate Army, Lewis saw action in 37 battles and skirmishes.

Postwar career
Following the war, Lewis returned to his peacetime career as a civil engineer, serving as the State Engineer of North Carolina for thirteen years, plus many years as road-master, construction engineer, chief engineer, and general superintendent for several railroads. In 1899, he was chief engineer for the Albany and Raleigh Railroad.

Lewis died on January 7, 1901, from pneumonia.

Ancestry

Through his paternal Grandmother Ann Harrison, he is descended from early immigrant Captain James Neale and his wife Anne Gill, who was a Lady-in-Waiting to Queen Henrietta Maria (the wife of King Charles I of England).

See also

List of American Civil War Generals (Confederate)

Notes

References
 Eicher, John H., and David J. Eicher, Civil War High Commands. Stanford: Stanford University Press, 2001. .
 Sifakis, Stewart. Who Was Who in the Civil War. New York: Facts On File, 1988. .
 Warner, Ezra J. Generals in Gray: Lives of the Confederate Commanders. Baton Rouge: Louisiana State University Press, 1959. .
 William Gaston Lewis
 Inventory of the William Gaston Lewis Papers, Manuscripts Department, UNC Library

1835 births
1901 deaths
Confederate States Army generals
People of North Carolina in the American Civil War
University of North Carolina at Chapel Hill alumni
19th-century American railroad executives
American Civil War prisoners of war